West Wycombe Park Polo Club is an HPA-affiliated polo club, playing on grounds in England, set within the West Wycombe Park Estate.

Founded in 1992, WWPPC operates a two-league (‘Amateur’ and ‘Pro’) format for selected tournaments, promoting polo for home and visiting teams.  Instruction and livery is available.  The club has three polo grounds (two of which are boarded), runs evening chukkas (enabling play after work) and has a busy tournament schedule with matches played on weekends between May and September.

Every year a team from West Wycombe play for the Quatros Amigos Trophy at Ham Polo Club.

President 

Sir Edward Dashwood Bt.

Chairmen 
Simon Holland: 1995 to 2002
Charles Betz: 2002 to 2007
Simon de Jongh: 2007 to 2012
Jason Ollivier: 2012
Robert Gourlay: 2012 to present

Polo Managers 
Tobias Pejkovic: 2006
Jairo Rojas: 2007
Richard Seavill: 2008 to 2010
Charley Cudworth: 2011 to 2012
Becky Bazzard: 2013 to 2015
Gaston Devrient: 2016

Trophies 

 Welcome Cup	
 Friends Cup
 Spring Shield
 Hell Fire Trophy

 Amateur Challenge Cup
 Chairman's Cup
 Ladies & Gentlemen
 Quatro Amigos

 Sponsors Cup
 Countryside Cup
 Lakeside Cup
 Farewell Cup
 The Indian Summer Trophy

References

External links 
 Official Site of West Wycombe Park Polo Club
Hurlingham Polo Association - Governing body of the sport in the UK & Ireland]
020 London 

Polo clubs in the United Kingdom
Sports clubs established in 1995